Venice, from the Porch of Madonna della Salute is a 19th century oil painting by J. M. W. Turner. Done in oil on canvas, the painting depicts an imagined image of Venice, as the view shown is not realistic. The painting was inspired by one of Turner's three visits to Venice, and showcases Turner's skill as a maritime artist. The work is in the collection of the Metropolitan Museum of Art.

References 

1835 paintings
Paintings in the collection of the Metropolitan Museum of Art
Cityscape paintings of Venice
Paintings by J. M. W. Turner
Maritime paintings